Megachile alta is a species of bee in the family Megachilidae. It was described by Mitchell in 1930, and has been found in both Costa Rica and Brazil.

References

Alta
Insects described in 1930